Nashoba may refer to:
 Nashoba, Oklahoma
 Nashoba Commune
 Nashoba County, Indian Territory, a political subdivision of the Choctaw Nation
 Nashoba Valley, Massachusetts
 Nashoba Valley Ski Area
 Nashoba Regional High School